First Bank Tower may refer to:

 225 South Sixth in Minneapolis, formerly known as First Bank Tower
 First Bank and Trust Tower in Louisiana, more commonly known as the LL&E Tower
 First Canadian Place in Toronto, also known as First Bank Tower